Aksha is an ancient Egyptian temple, rebuilt in part at the National Museum of Sudan in Khartoum as part of the International Campaign to Save the Monuments of Nubia. The temple was built around 1250 BC by Ramses II. It is situated in the far north of present-day Sudan, a few kilometers south of Faras, on the west side of the Nile. On the temple walls, several sacrifices are depicted. The location of the temple was not well chosen, as it is only a few inches above the high tide of the Nile. This resulted in penetration of the lower wall layers, salt crystallization on the wall surfaces, and stones being worn down over the centuries. In addition, the temple was preyed upon by the local population. Other finds at the site include cemeteries, parts of Qubanstele, and the stele with the "blessings of Ptah".

The 1963 excavations of Aksha were initiated because of the construction of the Aswan Dam. One of the discoveries included a relatively well-preserved temple wall, the western wall of the courtyard. Along its entire length, it contains a carved list of the foreign nations which Ramses II. After the temple was deemed worthy of preservation, archaeologists from the University of Ghana sawed the wall into individual blocks. It was rebuilt in the garden of the National Museum, protected by a pavilion.

References

Further reading
 Friedrich W. Hinkel: "Auszug aus Nubien". 2. Auflage. Akademie-Verlag, Berlin 1983.
 Auke A. Tadema, Bob Tadema Sporry: Unternehmen Pharao. Die Rettung der ägyptischen Tempel. Gustav Lübbe Verlag, Bergisch Gladbach 1978,  (Originalausgabe: Operatie Farao's. Egypte's tempels gered! Fibula-Van Dishoeck, Haarlem 1977).

Egyptian temples
2nd-century BC religious buildings and structures
2nd-century BC establishments
1963 archaeological discoveries
International Campaign to Save the Monuments of Nubia